Vasara (Finnish for hammer) can refer to:

Jussi Vasara (born 1987), Finnish footballer
Mika Vasara (born 1983), Finnish shot putter
Vesa Vasara (born 1976), Finnish footballer
Vasara, Estonia, village in Viiratsi Parish, Viljandi County, Estonia
Vasara (video game), 2000 video game

Finnish-language surnames